SPATC1L is a protein that in humans is encoded by the SPATC1L gene.

References

External links

Further reading